Lawrence Richardson of Great Crosby, Lancashire, was an English martyr. 

Born Lawrence Johnson, he was the son of Richard Johnson, of Great Crosby, Lancashire, and a Fellow of Brasenose College. He was ordained priest at Douai in March 1577, and afterwards, taking the name of Richardson, left for the English Mission, in late July.

In 1581, Richardson was arrested in London on his way to France and imprisoned in Newgate, charged with complicity in the pretended "Rheims and Rome plot". He was executed at Tyburn in 1582, with Luke Kirby. His feast day is May 30. He was beatified in 1886.

See also
 Douai Martyrs

References

Year of birth missing
1582 deaths
English beatified people
People from Crosby, Merseyside
16th-century Roman Catholic martyrs
Forty-one Martyrs of England and Wales